In enzymology, a ricinine nitrilase is an enzyme that catalyzes the chemical reaction

ricinine + 2 H2O  3-carboxy-4-methoxy-N-methyl-2-pyridone + NH3

Thus, the two substrates of this enzyme are ricinine and H2O, whereas its two products are 3-carboxy-4-methoxy-N-methyl-2-pyridone and NH3.

This enzyme belongs to the family of hydrolases, those acting on carbon-nitrogen bonds other than peptide bonds, specifically in nitriles.  The systematic name of this enzyme class is ricinine aminohydrolase. This enzyme participates in nitrogen metabolism.

References

 
 
 

EC 3.5.5
Enzymes of unknown structure